Brzuskowola  is a village in the administrative district of Gmina Borowie, within Garwolin County, Masovian Voivodeship, in east-central Poland. The village has a population of over 48 inhabitants.

References

Brzuskowola